Pak Jong-ju (born 14 March 1997) is a North Korean weightlifter competing in the 69 kg and 62 kg categories until 2018 and 67 kg starting in 2018 after the International Weightlifting Federation reorganized the categories.

Career
He was the Gold Medalist at the 2014 Summer Youth Olympics in the 62 kg category. In 2018 he competed in the newly created 67 kg division at the 2018 World Weightlifting Championships and finished sixth.

He competed at the 2019 IWF World Cup (a qualifying event for the 2020 Summer Olympics) held in Fuzhou. He won a gold medal in the total with 318 kg competing in the 67 kg division.

Major results

References

External links

Living people
North Korean male weightlifters
Weightlifters at the 2014 Summer Youth Olympics
1997 births
World Weightlifting Championships medalists
Youth Olympic gold medalists for North Korea
21st-century North Korean people